Nani Darnell is the widow and former assistant of American magician Mark Wilson. As Wilson's co-star throughout his television magic career, Darnell heavily influenced public perceptions of magicians' assistants.

The role which really defined Darnell's public image was in Wilson's series The Magic Land of Allakazam, which premiered in October 1960 and ran for four years on national television in the United States. That series has been widely credited with establishing the credibility of magic as a form of television entertainment. In doing so it also established Darnell as a nationally known figure. She subsequently appeared with Wilson in a host of other television shows, including the Magic Circus specials and the fictional mystery series The Magician.

Nani and Mark's son Greg Wilson has followed in their footsteps by becoming a professional illusionist.

References

External links
 
 Mark Wilson's official website

Year of birth missing (living people)
Living people
American magicians